Gerardina Alida "Gerdi" Verbeet (born 18 April 1951) is a retired Dutch politician and political consultant who served as Speaker of the House of Representatives from 6 December 2006 to 19 September 2012. A member of the Labour Party (PvdA), she is the second officeholder elected independently by the House of Representatives after her predecessor Frans Weisglas. She served as a member of the House of Representatives from 26 July 2002 to 19 September 2012 and previously from 11 December 2001 until 22 May 2002.

Biography

Early life
Verbeet attended the Gymnasium in Amsterdam and began a study in social geography, which she did not finish. Instead she studied Dutch language and literature and worked as a teacher.

Politics
Between 1994 and 2001 she was political advisor to State Secretary Tineke Netelenbos and parliamentary leader Ad Melkert.

On 23 May 2001 she became a member of the House of Representatives, filling the vacancy left by Rob van Gijzel. In the general election of 2002 she was not reelected, but in July 2002 she reentered the House of Representatives, filling the vacancy left by Eveline Herfkens. In the Dutch general election of 2003 and 2006 she was able to retain her seat. In the House of Representatives, Verbeet concentrated on sport, policy regarding elderly people, and state pensions.

On 6 December 2006 she was elected Speaker of the House of Representatives, defeating ministers Maria van der Hoeven of the Christian Democratic Appeal and Henk Kamp of the People's Party for Freedom and Democracy. She is the second female Speaker, after Jeltje van Nieuwenhoven, and the second Speaker elected in independent elections, after Frans Weisglas. Verbeet was reelected as Speaker on 22 June 2010, after the general elections of 9 June.

On 2 May 2012 Verbeet made known that she would not stand for re-election as a member of the House of Representatives and speaker for the Dutch general election of 2012 and would retire from active politics.

Personal
Verbeet is divorced from her first husband and remarried in 2010 with fellow Labour Party politician Wim Meijer after a relationship of three years. She has two sons; two stepdaughters and three grandchildren and lives in Amsterdam.

Decorations

References

External links

Official
  Mw. G.A. (Gerdi) Verbeet Parlement & Politiek

 
 
 

 

 

1951 births
Living people
Dutch agnostics
Dutch nonprofit directors
Dutch nonprofit executives
Dutch political consultants
Dutch speechwriters
Knights of the Order of Orange-Nassau
Labour Party (Netherlands) politicians
Members of the House of Representatives (Netherlands)
Politicians from Amsterdam
Speakers of the House of Representatives (Netherlands)
Women legislative speakers
20th-century Dutch civil servants
20th-century Dutch women politicians
20th-century Dutch politicians
21st-century Dutch civil servants
21st-century Dutch women politicians
21st-century Dutch politicians